Dunstan is a surname. Notable people with the surname include:

Albert Dunstan (1882–1950), Australian politician
Alex Dunstan (1885–1964), Australian rules footballer
Bernard Dunstan (1920–2017), British artist
Bill Dunstan (born 1949), American football player
Darren Dunstan (born 1972), Canadian–American voice actor
David Dunstan (born 1950), Australian writer, journalist and historian
Don Dunstan (1926–1999), Australian politician in South Australia
Donald Dunstan (governor) (1923–2011), Australian army officer, later Governor of South Australia
Eric Dunstan (1894–1973), British radio announcer and commentator
George Dunstan (born 1938), Australian broadcaster and sports administrator
George Dunstan (footballer) (1904–1965), Australian rules footballer
Graeme Dunstan (born 1942), Australian cultural and political activist and event organiser
Graeme Dunstan (footballer) (born 1952), Australian rules footballer
Ian Dunstan (born 1955), Australian rules footballer
Jeffrey Dunstan (c. 1759–1797), English wig merchant and popular candidate in the Garrat Elections
Jordan Dunstan (born 1993), Canadian soccer player
Joy Dunstan (born 1951), Australian actress
Keith Dunstan (1925–2013), Australian journalist and author, son of William Dunstan
Luke Dunstan (born 1995), Australian rules footballer
Malcolm Dunstan (born 1950), English cricketer
Marcus Dunstan (born 1975), American screenwriter and director
Maurie Dunstan (1929–1991), Australian rules football
Peggy Dunstan (1920–2010), New Zealand poet and writer
Priscilla Dunstan, Australian singer and developer of the Dunstan Baby Language hypothesis
Robert Dunstan (1877–1963), British doctor and political activist
Terry Dunstan (born 1968), British boxer
Thomas Dunstan (Australian politician) (1873–1954), Australian politician
Thomas B. Dunstan (1850–1902), American politician
Thomas Dunstan (water polo) (born 1997), American water polo player
William Dunstan (1895–1957), Australian soldier and Victoria Cross recipient
Wyndham Dunstan (1861–1949), British chemist and academic